Paranerius is a genus of flies in the family Neriidae.

Species
Paranerius continentalis Hennig, 1937
Paranerius fibulatus Enderlein, 1922
Paranerius mikii Bigot, 1883

References

Brachycera genera
Neriidae
Taxa named by Jacques-Marie-Frangile Bigot
Diptera of Asia
Diptera of Australasia